The War of the Straits (1350-1355) was a third conflict fought in the series of the Venetian-Genoese wars. There were three causes for the outbreak of the war: the Genoese hegemony over the Black Sea, the capture by Genoa of Chios and Phocaea and the Latin war which caused the Byzantine Empire to lose control over the straits of the Black Sea, thus making it more difficult for the Venetians to reach the Asian ports.

Historical background
After signing the treaty of Nymphaeum with the Byzantines in 1261 the Republic of Genoa achieved commercial hegemony in the Black Sea. This hegemony was unacceptable for the Republic of Venice which extended its trade networks towards Pontus and around 1291 founded a colony in Tabriz, a city located in the north of Iran between the Black Sea and the Caspian Sea and at the time the capital of the Ilkhanate. At the beginning of the 14th century the Genoese position was far superior to that of Venice because Genoa, thanks to the Treaty of Nymphaeum, could base its commercial network on numerous colonies located between Galata (the Genoese quarter of Constantinople) and Caffa in Crimea. The first Venetian colony on the Black Sea was granted in 1319 by the emperor of Trebizond Alexios II, who allowed the Venetians to settle in the district of Leontokastron in Trebizond in exchange for customs duties. 

Conflicts with the Genoese quarter and the beginning of a civil war in the Empire of Trebizond forced the Venetian Senate to suspend the dispatch of merchant ships to the region in 1346. Parallel to the decline of their Trebizond settlement, the Venetians were forced to leave Tabriz in 1338, where the strong Genoese presence and regional instability after the death of khan Abu Sa'id had jeopardized the safety of the Venetian merchants.

The Venetians could count up to that moment on a strong commercial presence in the Crimea in the city of Soldaia, which, however, in the first half of the fourteenth century was struggling to survive due to ruthless competition of the Genoese merchants in Caffa and continuous attacks by the Tatars and khan Uzbeg of the Golden Horde; Soldaia lost any role in international trade to the advantage of Caffa. Due to constant conflicts with the Genoese community in 1343 the Venetians also lost their outpost at Tana, a city located at the mouth of the Don which allowed Venice to reach the markets of Central Asia. In 1344, however, Khan of the Golden Horde, Jani Beg, besieged the Genoese city of Caffa which, thanks to its fortifications, was able to withstand the siege. The Venetians seized the opportunity and in July 1345 by allying the Genoese forces they obtained access to Caffa exempt from any tax. The following year, Caffa was again attacked by the Khan's army, but Venice did not help with the defense of the Genoese settlement. To the contrary, it negotiated separately with the Khan, gaining access to Tana again and provoking the anger of the Genoese.

References 

Wars involving the Republic of Venice
Wars involving the Republic of Genoa
1350s conflicts
14th century in the Republic of Genoa
14th century in the Republic of Venice
1350s in Europe